Spy for a Day is a 1940 British comedy thriller film directed by Mario Zampi and starring Douglas Wakefield, Paddy Browne and Jack Allen. The screenplay concerns a British farmer who is abducted by the Germans during World War I.

Premise
During World War I, a British farmer is abducted by the Germans to take the place of a spy about to be executed whom he closely resembles.

Cast
 Douglas Wakefield as Sam Gates
 Paddy Browne as Martha Clowes
 Jack Allen as Captain Bradshaw
 Albert Lieven as Captain Hausemann
 Nicholas Hannen as Colonel Pemberton
 Gibb McLaughlin as Colonel Ludwig
 Allan Jeayes as Colonel Roberts
 Alf Goddard as Sergeant Bryan
 George Hayes as Corporal Boehme
 Eliot Makeham as Trufit
 Hay Petrie as Britt
 O. B. Clarence as Medical Officer

References

External links

1940 films
1940s spy comedy films
British comedy thriller films
British spy comedy films
British war comedy films
World War I spy films
Films directed by Mario Zampi
Films with screenplays by Anatole de Grunwald
British black-and-white films
1940s comedy thriller films
1940s war comedy films
1940 comedy films
1940s English-language films
1940s British films